"Bailar Contigo" is a Tropipop song by Colombian recording artist Carlos Vives. It was released in Colombian's radios as the third single from his fourteenth studio album Corazón Profundo (2013) on May 5, 2013.

Song information 
The song was written by himself and Andrés Castro and produced by the same Castro. "Bailar Contigo" has been described as one of the best track of the album according to the review of Allmusic. And Carlos Quintana from About.com said that "is the electric guitar in the intro of the song, have well-crafted arrangements and nice lyrics".

In an interview in Colombia, Vives expressed that the song "Is a tribute to the ceremony to dance with that special woman. I composed it remembering that time, of that eagerness to go on a friday, when had a plan to go dancing with somebody and finally meet with that person. Evokes the romance, that love symbolized in the ritual of going to pick her up and go dancing".

Track listing 
Album version
"Bailar Contigo" -

Charts

Weekly charts

Year-end charts

See also 
 List of number-one songs of 2013 (Colombia)
 List of Billboard number-one Latin songs of 2013

Release history

References 

Carlos Vives songs
2013 singles
Number-one singles in Colombia
Spanish-language songs
2013 songs
Songs written by Carlos Vives
Songs written by Andrés Castro
Sony Music Latin singles